Heliothis nubigera, the eastern bordered straw, is a species of moth of the family Noctuidae. It is found in arid areas in the Palearctic realm.

Technical description and variation

The wingspan is 35–40 mm. Forewing greyish ochreous; reniform stigma dark grey, attached to the grey costal median spot; orbicular annular with grey centre; outer line lunulate dentate, the teeth whitish, separated by a brown shade from the subterminal line; hindwing pearly white with broad blackish outer border, containing a double whitish blotch between veins 2 and 4; veins and cell spot dark; fringe white.

Biology
Adults are on wing year round and there are probably two generations.

Larva red-brown, dorsal line darker, subdorsal band alternately black and white; a diffused brown sublateral band. The larvae are polyphagous on various wild herbaceous plants. Recorded food plants include Zygophyllum, globe thistles (Echinops species), honeysuckle (Lonicera species), Mediterranean saltbush (Atriplex halimus), Retama raetam, Suaeda asphaltica and bushy bean-caper (Zygophyllum dumosum).

Distribution
It is found in all the Levant countries.

References

External links
 Eastern bordered straw on UKmoths
 Funet Taxonomy
 Lepiforum.de

Heliothis
Moths described in 1851
Moths of Africa
Moths of Asia
Moths of Cape Verde
Moths of Europe
Moths of the Middle East
Taxa named by Gottlieb August Wilhelm Herrich-Schäffer